John James Inglis Highet (3 July 1886 – 3 May 1950) was a Scottish amateur football outside right who played in the Scottish League for Queen's Park.

Personal life 
Highet's father was Scottish international footballer Thomas Highet. He served as a second lieutenant in the Machine Gun Corps during the First World War.

Career statistics

References

1886 births
1950 deaths
Scottish footballers
Scottish Football League players
British Army personnel of World War I
Association football outside forwards
Queen's Park F.C. players
Machine Gun Corps officers
Footballers from Glasgow
Rangers F.C. players
Ayr United F.C. players
People from Govan